28 Squadron SAAF is a squadron of the South African Air Force. It is currently a medium transport squadron flying Lockheed C-130BZ Hercules medium transport aircraft.

 First formed: 1 June 1943 (At Almaza, Egypt.) The squadron flew Dakota DC3's as part of No. 216 Group RAF of the Mediterranean Allied Air Forces in May 1945

Aircraft

References

Squadrons of the South African Air Force
Military units and formations in Pretoria
Military units and formations established in 1943